The Grammy Award for Best Gospel Vocal Performance by a Duo or Group, Choir or Chorus was awarded from 1984 to 1990.  The award was originally titled Best Gospel Performance by a Duo or Group.  This was changed to Best Gospel Performance by a Duo or Group, Choir or Chorus in 1986 and "Vocal" was added in 1990.

Years reflect the year in which the Grammy Awards were presented, for works released in the previous year.

Recipients

References

Grammy Awards for gospel music